The Victory Bell refers to two bells used by the University of Portland at sporting and other events. The original bell is installed outside the Chiles Center, and a new one was cast in 2012.

See also
 Bell Circles II
 Korean Temple Bell
 Liberty Bell (Portland, Oregon)

References

External links

  (September 7, 2012), University of Portland

Individual bells in the United States
Outdoor sculptures in Portland, Oregon
University of Portland